Henry, Prince of Wales may refer to:

Princes

Princes of Wales 
Henry V of England (between 1399 and 1413)
Henry VIII of England (between 1502 and 1509)
Henry Frederick, Prince of Wales (between 1603 and 1612), heir to James I of England, died before becoming king

Other princes 
Harry, Prince of Wales (Blackadder), a fictional character in the first series of the British TV comedy Blackadder

See also
Henry I of England (c. 1068–1135), king before the title Prince of Wales was used for the heir to the English throne
Henry II of England (1133–1189), king before the title Prince of Wales was used for the heir to the English throne
Henry III of England (1207–1272), king before the title Prince of Wales was used for the heir to the English throne
Henry IV of England (1366–1413), not the generally accepted heir before becoming King
Henry VI of England (1421–1471), became king too young to become Prince of Wales
Henry VII of England (1457–1509), not the generally accepted heir before becoming King
Henry, Duke of Cornwall (1511–1511), died too young to become Prince of Wales
Prince Henry (disambiguation)